The State Register of Heritage Places is maintained by the Heritage Council of Western Australia. As of 2023, 122 places are heritage-listed in the Shire of Ravensthorpe, of which one is on the State Register of Heritage Places, the Metropolitan Hotel in Hopetoun.

List

State Register of Heritage Places
The Western Australian State Register of Heritage Places, as of 2023, lists the following state registered place within the Shire of Ravensthorpe:

Shire of Ravensthorpe heritage-listed places
The following places are heritage listed in the Shire of Ravensthorpe but are not State registered:

References

Laverton
Shire of Ravensthorpe